Skogskyrkogården may refer to:
 Skogskyrkogården, Stockholm, Sweden
 Skogskyrkogården metro station
 Skogskyrkogården Chapel (Karlskoga)